Bündheim is a village that forms a part (Stadtteil) of Bad Harzburg in the district of Goslar in Lower Saxony, Germany. As of 2020, Bündheim had a population of 5,204.

Geography 
Bündheim is positioned between the Harz mountains to the south and the valley of the Radau to the north. The residential area is merged with those of Schlewecke and Bad Harzburg city. The Bleiche, a tributary of the Radau, flows through Bündheim.

History

Etymology 
The name Bündheim is a composition of a word cognating to Old High German biunda (separated private lot), meaning that Bündheim was originally part of Schlewecke and later manifested as an own community. Other names were:

1251: Buntem
1353: Büntem
1459: Bünthem
19th century: Büntheim
20th century: Bündheim

Timeline 
It had been seat of the administrative district of Bad Harzburg since 1573 and played a crucial role in the formation of Bad Harzburg. The Bündheim castle as the seat of this district was destroyed in 1626 during Thirty Years' War, after it reconstruction it had to be torn down owing to construction errors.

On January 1, 1963, Bündheim merged with Schlewecke to the new community Bündheim-Schlewecke that was incorporated into Bad Harzburg nine years later, on July 1, 1972.

Infrastructure 
Bündheim is penetrated by the Landesstraße L 501, leading from Eckertal at the border to Saxony-Anhalt through Bad Harzburg to Göttingerode and Oker. Until the 1980s, this route was part of the Bundesstraße 6.

Gallery

References 

Goslar (district)
Bad Harzburg